Fotbal Club Milsami Orhei, commonly known as Milsami Orhei, or simply Milsami, is a Moldovan football club based in Orhei, Moldova, currently playing in the Moldovan Super Liga.

Previously known as FC Viitorul Orhei, it won its first league title in 2015, becoming the first team to take the title away from the cities of Chișinău and Tiraspol.

History
2005 – founded as Viitorul Step-Soci
2008 – renamed Viitorul Orhei
2010 – renamed Milsami Orhei
2011 – renamed Milsami-Ursidos Orhei
2012 – renamed Milsami Orhei

Current squad

Coaching staff

Honours

League
Moldovan National Division
Winners (1): 2014–15
Runners-up (2): 2017, 2018

Moldovan "A" Division
Winners (1): 2008–09

Cup
Moldovan Cup
Winners (2): 2011–12, 2017–18
Runners-up (1): 2015–16

Moldovan Super Cup
Winners (2): 2012, 2019
Runners-up (1): 2015

League history

European record

References

External links
 Official website 
 Profile at DiviziaNationala.com 

 
Milsami, FC
Milsami, FC
2005 establishments in Moldova
Orhei